Henri Mehu (13 August 1891 – 16 March 1973) was a French equestrian. He competed in the individual dressage event at the 1920 Summer Olympics.

References

1891 births
1973 deaths
French male equestrians
Olympic equestrians of France
Equestrians at the 1920 Summer Olympics
Sportspeople from Ain